Sun Xin is a fictional character in Water Margin, one of the Four Great Classical Novels in Chinese literature. Nicknamed "Little Yuchi", he ranks 100th among the 108 Stars of Destiny and 64th among the 72 Earthly Fiends.

Background
Tall and strong with shiny eyes, Sun Xin is the younger brother of Sun Li, garrison commandant of Dengzhou (登州; in present-day eastern Shandong). Sun Li is nicknamed "Sick Yuchi" as he resembles the Tang dynasty general Yuchi Gong in looks although they definitely differ in complexion as Sun's is pale, and also in that one of his favourite weapons is a steel club. That nickname spilled over to Sun Xin, who is called "Little Yuchi", The Sun brothers' ancestral home is in Qiongzhou (瓊州; present-day Hainan).

Sun Xin's wife is Gu Dasao, a cousin of the hunter brothers Xie Zhen and Xie Bao. The couple run an inn in Dengzhou (登州; in present-day eastern Shandong), not far from the rural home of the Xies.

Prison raid in Dengzhou
Gu Dasao receives news from the jailer Yue He of Dengzhou prison, whose sister is married to Sun Li, that Xie Zhen and Xie Bao have been jailed and might be murdered. The Xies have smashed up the house of one Squire Mao after failing to find a tiger they shot that had fallen into the old man's garden. In fact, the squire had sent the tiger to the prefecture office to claim reward.

Gu consults with Sun Xin, who enlists the help of the outlaws Zou Yuan and Zou Run. Gu is worried that her brother-in-law Sun Li would stand in their way. So she pretends to be ill and gets Sun Li to visit her. When Sun appears, the couple threaten him to decide either to join them or fight them. Sun reluctantly signs on to their plan. With the help of Yue He, the group break into the prison and free the Xie brothers. They then flee to join the outlaws of Liangshan Marsh.

Battle against the Zhu Family Village
Before going up to the stronghold, Sun Li volunteers to infiltrate the Zhu Family Manor, which Liangshan has failed to take in two offensives. As Sun Li has learnt combat from the same teacher as Luan Tingyu, the martial arts instructor of the village, he wins the confidence of the Zhus. Sun Xin, together with his wife, Zou Yuan, Zou Run, the Xie brothers and Yue He, goes on a rampage inside the manor, taking it by surprise, when Sun Li gives his signal. The fall of the Zhu Family Manor is a huge contribution of the group before their acceptance into Liangshan.

Campaigns and later life
Sun Xin and his wife are put in charge of an inn which acts as a lookout of Liangshan after 108 Stars of Destiny came together in what is called the Grand Assembly. The couple participate in the campaigns against the Liao invaders and rebel forces in Song territory following amnesty from Emperor Huizong for Liangshan.

Sun Xin and Gu Dasao survive the campaigns. Although conferred the title Martial Gentleman of Grace, he does not want to serve the government and returns to Dengzhou with his wife and his brother, where he lives as a commoner.

References
 
 
 
 
 
 
 

72 Earthly Fiends
Fictional characters from Hainan